Corydalis solida, fumewort or bird-in-a-bush, is a species of flowering plant in the family Papaveraceae, native to moist, shady habitats in northern Europe and Asia. It is cultivated for its deeply divided, ferny leaves and narrow, long-spurred flowers which appear in spring. The flowers show color variation, and may be mauve, purple, red, or white.

Systematics
The species was originally named in 1753 by Linnaeus as the variety solida of his Fumaria bulbosa. It was raised to the species F. solida by Philip Miller in 1771. Its current assignment to the genus Corydalis was made by Joseph Philippe de Clairville in 1811.

Four subspecies are recognized:
 C. solida subsp. incisa Lidén
 C. solida subsp. longicarpa Lidén
 C. solida subsp. solida
 C. solida subsp. subremota Popov ex Lidén & Zetterlund

C. solida subsp. incisa  (pale purple flowers) has gained the Royal Horticultural Society's Award of Garden Merit.

References

External links

Distribution map at Virtuella floran

solida
Ephemeral plants
Flora of Europe
Garden plants
Flora of Lebanon
Plants described in 1753
Taxa named by Carl Linnaeus